Misnomer Point is the ice-free tipped point projecting 400 m westwards from the northwest coast of Alfatar Peninsula, Robert Island in the South Shetland Islands, Antarctica and forming the east side of the entrance to Carlota Cove.  The area was visited by early 19th century sealers operating from Clothier Harbour.

The feature is named in reference to a previous misnaming when it was identified incorrectly on charts as 'Cornwall Point', a variant form of the name originally given to nearby Cornwall Island.

Location

See also
 Alfatar Peninsula
 Robert Island

Map
 L.L. Ivanov. Antarctica: Livingston Island and Greenwich, Robert, Snow and Smith Islands. Scale 1:120000 topographic map.  Troyan: Manfred Wörner Foundation, 2009.

References
 SCAR Composite Antarctic Gazetteer.

Headlands of Robert Island